The lycée Stendhal, formerly Cité scolaire Stendhal, is a secondary and higher education establishment in Grenoble.  It is the oldest lycée in Grenoble, and its pupils have included Stendhal (after whom it is now named) and Champollion.  It is located at 1 bis, place Jean-Achard, and can be visited by the public on certain Saturdays.

History
It was founded as a Jesuit college in 1651, and still has a chapel and an astronomical and astrological sundial dating to 1673.  In 1987, an international section was added but has since relocated to the Cité Scolaire Internationale de Grenoble (CSI Europole).

See also
 List of Jesuit sites

References

External links
 Official site 

Stendhal
Stendhal
1651 establishments in France